Ee Lee (1984 – September 19, 2020) was an Asian-American woman who was raped and killed by a group of black teenagers in an allegedly racially-motivated daylight attack in Milwaukee.

Rape and killing 
Ee Lee was raped by then-17 year old Kamare Lewis and then-15 year old Kevin Spencer while nine others watched. She was then beaten and dragged to the pond in Washington Park and left to die. She was found half-clothed and unconscious but still breathing. Video footage shows that the perpetrators directed racial slurs against the victim. She was taken to Froedtert Hospital for treatment but died three days later.

Accused 
Two local African American teenagers, Kamare Lewis, 17, and Kevin Spencer, 15, were arrested and charged with first-degree intentional homicide and first-degree sexual assault with an aggravating factor of great bodily harm. Lewis had allegedly recorded the rape and killing on his phone and had shared the video with his friends. Approximately nine other youths were present in the video. Spencer confessed to raping and murdering Lee. Spencer was involved in another murder in December 2020.

According to the criminal complaint in two different interviews, one of the suspects said that they never called for help at all because he thought she was dead or soon to be dead and it "wouldn't have made a difference and that he didn't really care about her at all because she is not someone he knows personally."

Response 
Vigils were held for Lee by the Hmong American Women’s Association and broader Wisconsin Hmong community.

See also 
 2021 Atlanta spa shootings—Killing of eight people, six of whom were Asian women, at an Atlanta massage parlor
 Hmong in Wisconsin

References 

2020 in Wisconsin
Crime in Wisconsin
Deaths by beating in the United States
Deaths by person in Wisconsin
September 2020 events in the United States
Asian-American issues
African-American–Asian-American relations
Hmong-American culture in Wisconsin
Crime in Milwaukee
Criminal duos
Asian-American-related controversies
September 2020 crimes in the United States
Violence against women in the United States
Incidents of violence against women
Rapes in the United States
History of women in Wisconsin